Le Noyer is a commune in the Cher department in the Centre-Val de Loire region of France.

Geography

Population

Sights
 A seventeenth-century farm and mill.
 The church of Notre-Dame, dating from the twelfth century.
 The chateau of Boucard, rebuilt in the sixteenth century over the feudal castle.

See also
Communes of the Cher department

References

Communes of Cher (department)